BBB may refer to:

Codes
 bbb, the ISO 639:b language code for Barai
 BBB, a type of birdshot used in shotgun shells
 BBB, BBB+, BBB−, investment grade Β bond credit ratings

Film and television 
 Band Baaja Baaraat, a 2010 Bollywood romantic comedy
 Bakugan Battle Brawlers, an anime series
 Bear Behaving Badly, a British TV show starring Barney Harwood
 Beethoven's Big Break, the sixth installment in the Beethoven film series
 Big Bad Beetleborgs, a 1990s children's TV show
 Big Brother Brasil, the Brazilian version of the reality show Big Brother
 Big Buck Bunny, an open-movie produced by the Blender Institute, with open-source tools
 Britain's Best Bakery, a British daytime cookery show produced by ITV
 BBB, the production code for the 1970 Doctor Who serial Doctor Who and the Silurians

Medicine
 Blood–brain barrier, a structure that protects the brain from chemicals in the blood
 Bundle branch block, refers to a defect of the heart's electrical conduction system

Organisations
 BBB, Better Business Bureau, a North American organization of businesses supporting consumer rights
 Bredbandsbolaget, a Swedish ISP
 Bad Blue Boys, supporters of the Zagreb football club GNK Dinamo Zagreb
 ΒΒΒ, Beta Beta Beta, an honor society and academic fraternity for higher education students specializing in biology
 Bed, Bath, and Beyond, a home products store
 Big Blue Bubble, a gaming company

Politics
 Biotic Baking Brigade, a loosely connected group of activists known for throwing pies
 BBB, Bulgarian Business Bloc, a former political party in Bulgaria
 Blanke Bevrydingsbeweging, a South African white supremacist and Neo-Nazi group
 Farmer–Citizen Movement, a political party in the Netherlands

Science and technology
 Bioscience, Biotechnology, and Biochemistry, a scientific journal
 Bombay Before the British, a Portuguese research project in History of Architecture (2004–2007)
 BeagleBone Black, a single-board computer

Other
 Bam Bam Bigelow (1961–2007), the ringname of professional wrestler Scott Bigelow
 Banat, Bačka and Baranja, a de facto province of the Kingdom of Serbia and the Kingdom of Serbs, Croats and Slovenes
 Baseball Boss, a web-based, free online baseball game
 Beach Blanket Babylon, was the world's longest-running musical revue
 Big Blue Book, a series of small staple-bound books
 BigBlueButton, an open source web conferencing system
 Bikes Blues and BBQ, an annual motorcycle rally in Fayetteville, Arkansas, United States
 Black Blood Brothers, a light novel series written by Kohei Azano
 Blood Blockade Battlefront, a manga series written and illustrated by Yasuhiro Nightow
 Big Baller Brand, LaVar Balls family brand
 Brown Buttabean, Boxer and Community Worker
 Brush, Book, Bed, an American Academy of Pediatrics program for improving children’s health by creating a nighttime routine of brushing the child’s teeth, reading together and setting a bedtime
 Build Back Better (disambiguation), any one of several policies

Music
 Three Bs, Bach, Beethoven, and Brahms (sometimes Berlioz), three prominent classical composers
 Brendan B. Brown, frontman of alternative rock band Wheatus
 Big Bad Brad, the nickname of Brad Delson of the band Linkin Park
 Balkan Beat Box, an Israeli Gypsy punk band
 The Blues Brothers Band
 The Bollywood Brass Band
 Bad Boys Blue, a multinational pop group formed in Germany
 "BBB", a song by the band How to Destroy Angels from their EP How to Destroy Angels
 B.B.B (EP), a 2014 extended play by Korean girl group Dal Shabet featuring the single "B.B.B (Big Baby Baby)"

See also
 3B (disambiguation)
 B (disambiguation)
 B3 (disambiguation)
 BB (disambiguation)
 BBBB (disambiguation)
 BBBS (disambiguation)
 Bee Bee Bee, U.S. racehorse